Leonatus (foaled in 1880 in Kentucky, died 1898 in Kentucky) was an American Thoroughbred racehorse who won the 1883 Kentucky Derby.

Background
Leonatus was the son of Uncle John Harper's great racer and sire Longfellow, himself a son of the imported English stud Leamington. Leonatus' dam was the Daniel Swigert-bred Semper Felix, whose dam was by the great nineteenth-century American foundation stallion, Lexington, himself by Boston.

Purchased by the partnership of Jack P. Chinn and George W. Morgan, and thereafter stabled in Mercer County, Kentucky, Leonatus was trained by African American horseman Raleigh Colston Sr. as well as by John McGinty.

Leonatus raced in a new world of English "dash" races on the kind of racetracks we recognize today.

Racing career
Racing only once as juvenile, Leonatus finished second.  As a three-year-old, he won ten stakes, all in either Kentucky or Illinois, within the space of 49 days.  Although there were no official awards given until 1936, Leonatus was retrospectively chosen the American Champion Three-Year-Old Male Horse of 1883.

Winning the 1883 Kentucky Derby was a major accomplishment. Carrying 105 pounds and the 2-1 favorite, Leonatus was piloted by Billy Donohue, the jockey who'd ridden Sligo in the 1881 Derby, coming in fourth. Running in mud on a clear, cold day, Leonatus was up against the colt Drake Carter, trained by Green B. Morris, who hoped to take his second consecutive Derby (he'd won with Apollo in 1882). Drake Carter leaped into the lead, but Leonatus caught him at a quarter of a mile. A quarter of a mile farther on, Leonatus was ahead by three lengths. In the homestretch, Lord Raglan made a strong bid, but though it carried him forward, he tired.  Leonatus won over Drake Carter by three lengths, earning $3,760.

Leonatus distinguished himself by eating the presentation roses. (Blankets of roses were not recorded being draped over the winning horse until 1896, when Ben Brush wore them.)

Stud record
Leonatus was retired to stud at the Clay Brothers' Runnymede Farm near Paris, Kentucky. He remained there until he was eighteen years old, dying in 1898.  He proved a fine sire, producing the 1898 American Derby winner Pink Coat and 1898 Suburban Handicap winner Tillo.  Leonatus lies in an unmarked grave on a bend of the Elkhorn Creek that runs through Runnymeade Farm. Near him lie Hindoo, Billet, and Sir Dixon.

Pedigree

References

1880 racehorse births
1898 racehorse deaths
Racehorses trained in the United States
Racehorses bred in Kentucky
Kentucky Derby winners
Thoroughbred family 12-b